Bayantal (rich steppe) is a sum of Govisümber Province in central Mongolia. In 2014, its population was 1,084.

Transport
The town is served by a railway station on the Trans-Mongolian Railway.

References

Districts of Govisümber Province